Waikoloa in an area and more specifically an ahupuaʻa in the South Kohala District of Hawaii.

Waikoloa may refer to:
 Waikoloa Beach, makai or ocean side of Waikoloa
 Waikoloa Challenger, or Hilton Waikoloa Village USTA Challenger, a tennis tournament held in the area
 Waikoloa Championships, a tennis tournament held in the area
 Waikoloa Village, mauka or mountain side of Waikoloa